Zagorica may refer to: 

In Serbia:
Zagorica, Serbia, a village in the Municipality of Topola 

In Slovenia:
Zagorica, Dobrepolje, a settlement in the Municipality of Dobrepolje, southern Slovenia
Zagorica, Litija, a settlement in the Municipality of Litija, central Slovenia
Zagorica, Mirna, a settlement in the Municipality of Mirna, southeastern Slovenia
Zagorica nad Kamnikom, a settlement in the Municipality of Kamnik, northern Slovenia
Zagorica pri Čatežu, a settlement in the Municipality of Trebnje, southeastern Slovenia
Zagorica pri Dobrniču, a settlement in the Municipality of Trebnje, southeastern Slovenia
Zagorica pri Dolskem, a settlement in the Municipality of Dol pri Ljubljani, central Slovenia
Zagorica pri Rovah, a settlement in the Municipality of Domžale, northern Slovenia
Zagorica pri Velikem Gabru, a village in the Municipality of Trebnje, southeastern Slovenia